Che Mohamad Zulkifly Jusoh (born 16 September 1959) is a Malaysian politician and former member of parliament for Setiu, Terengganu for a term from 2013 to 2018 and is the incumbent member of parliament for Besut since November 2022. He is a member of the Malaysian Islamic Party since 2018 and previously, he was a member of the United Malays National Organisation.

Political career 
As of 2022, he belongs to Malaysian Islamic Party, a component party of the Perikatan Nasional coalition.

Debate on the Domestic Violence Act (Amendments) 2017 bill 
On July 15, 2017 during the debate tabling on the Domestic Violence Act (Amendments) 2017 bill in the Dewan Rakyat, Jusoh remarked that wives withholding sex from their husbands or the right to marry another woman should be considered a Sharia-related crime or marital offence which is brought by emotional and psychological abuse. 

His statement sparked criticism from Women's Aid Organisation and many politicians; however Muslim Welfare Organisation Malaysia agreed with Jusoh's remarks.

Election results

Honours
  :
  Member of the Order of the Defender of the Realm (AMN) (2009)
  Commander of the Order of Meritorious Service (PJN) - Datuk (2017)

References 

Living people
Malaysian Muslims
Malaysian people of Malay descent
People from Terengganu
Former United Malays National Organisation politicians
1964 births
Malaysian Islamic Party politicians
Members of the Order of the Defender of the Realm
Commanders of the Order of Meritorious Service